Ramal de Montemor is a closed railway line which connected the stations of Torre da Gadanha and Montemor-o-Novo, in Portugal. It was opened on 2 September 1909, and closed in 1989.

See also 
 List of railway lines in Portugal
 List of Portuguese locomotives and railcars
 History of rail transport in Portugal

References

Iberian gauge railways

Railway lines in Portugal
Railway lines opened in 1909
Railway lines closed in 1989